Catana Chetwynd is an American cartoonist and author of Catana Comics. Catana has also authored three books: Little Moments Of Love, Snug: A Collection Of Comics About Dating Your Best Friend, and In Love & Pajamas: A Collection of Comics about Being Yourself Together.

Biography 
Catana Chetwynd grew up in Saratoga Springs, New York, where she spent her time drawing and studying psychology in State University of New York at Plattsburgh.

After her boyfriend John Freed encouraged her to start a comic about their relationship on Thanksgiving Day 2016, Catana created the first comic briefly afterwards and five more in the following days.

Catana currently works on Catana Comics full-time and is the author of two books: bestselling Little Moments Of Love, a collection of comics, and Snug: A Collection Of Comics About Dating Your Best Friend. After a tour in the United States, the cartoonist cancelled a tour in the United Kingdom in 2020 over “public health concerns” during the COVID-19 pandemic.

Works 
 Little Moments of Love
 Snug: A Collection Of Comics About Dating Your Best Friend
 In Love & Pajamas: A Collection of Comics about Being Yourself Together

Personal life 
Chetwynd currently lives in North Carolina with her fiancé, John Freed, and their dogs Murphy and Ringo.

References

External links 
 Catana Comics Official website

American women cartoonists
People from Saratoga Springs, New York
Year of birth missing (living people)
Living people
American cartoonists
21st-century American women